The Tavola Strozzi is a painting made using tempera on wood and attributed to Francesco Rosselli, datable to 1472-1473 and kept in the National Museum of San Martino in Naples. It represents a view of Naples from the 15th century.

References

External links 

 Official site 

Paintings in Naples
1472 paintings
Cityscape paintings